Pronymphes is an extinct genus of lacewing which existed during the Eocene period. It contains two species, Pronymphes mengeana and P. hoffeinsorum.

References 

Nymphidae
Eocene insects
Fossil taxa described in 1923
Fossils of Poland
Fossils of Russia
Prehistoric insect genera